David and Jonathan are figures in the Books of Samuel in the Hebrew Bible.

David and Jonathan may also refer to:

David and Jonathan (film), a 1920 British silent film
David and Jonathan (band), British pop duo
David et Jonathan, French vocal duo
David et Jonathas, an opera by Marc-Antoine Charpentier
Jonathan David (song), song and single by Belle and Sebastian
David and Jonathan (Rembrandt), a painting